Miami Animal Police is an American documentary reality television series that premiered on January 5, 2004, on Animal Planet. Produced by Lion Television, the program is set in Miami, Florida and the surrounding Miami-Dade County. It depicts the everyday duties of Miami-Dade Police Department Animal Services Unit, focusing on the work of twenty ACOs (animal control officers), five civilian animal cruelty investigators, six Miami-Dade Police Department administrators, and a pitbull investigator.

References

External links

2000s American reality television series
Animal Planet original programming
2000s American documentary television series
2004 American television series debuts
Television shows filmed in Miami
Television shows set in Miami
2000s American crime television series
Cruelty to animals
2004 American television series endings